PCNS may refer to:

 Peralta College for Non-Traditional Study, former name of Berkeley City College
 Progressive Conservative Association of Nova Scotia
 Microsoft Password Change Notification Service